Keonjhar (Sl. No.: 24) is a Vidhan Sabha constituency of Kendujhar district.
Area of this constituency includes Keonjhar, 12 GPs (Arsala, Balibandha, Jhumpura, Khendra, Kutugaon, Nahabeda, Naradapur, Nischintapur, Basantapur, Gumura, Malada and Nayagarh) of Jhumpura block and 5 GPs (Kodipasa, Suakati, Talachampei, Talakainsari and Kumundi) of Banspal block.

Elected members

15 elections held during 1951 to 2014. List of members elected from Keonjhar Vidhan Sabha constituency are:
2014: (24): Abhiram Naik (BJD)
2009: (24): Subarna Naik (BJD)
2004: (144): Mohan Charan Majhi (BJP)
2000: (144): Mohan Charan Majhi (BJP)
1995: (144): Jogendra Naik (BJP)
1990: (144): Chhotray Majhi (Janata Dal)
1985: (144): Chhotray Majhi (Janata Party)
1980: (144): Jogendra Naik (Congress-I)
1977: (144): Kumar Majhi (Janata Party)
1974: (144): Gobinda Munda (Swatantra)
1971: (129): Chhotray Majhi (Utkal Congress)
1967: (129): Gobinda Munda (Swatantra)
1961: (69): Janardan Bhanja Deo (Ganatantra Parishad)
1957: (47): Janardan Bhanja Deo (Ganatantra Parishada) and Krushna Chandra Mohapatra (Independent)
1951: (41): Laxmi Narayan Bhanja Deo (Independent) and Gobinda Munda (Ganatantra Parishada)

2019 Election Result

2014 Election Result
In the 2014 election, the Biju Janata Dal candidate Abhiram Naik defeated Bharatiya Janata Party candidate Mohan Charan Majhi by a margin of 8,676 votes.

2009 Election Result
In the 2009 election, the Biju Janata Dal candidate Subarna Naik defeated the Bharatiya Janata Party candidate Mohan Charan Majhi by a margin of 5,269 votes.

Notes

References

Kendujhar district
Assembly constituencies of Odisha